Cricket PNG, originally founded as the Papua New Guinea Cricket Board of Control, is the official governing body of the sport of cricket in Papua New Guinea. Its current headquarters is in Port Moresby. Cricket PNG was founded in 1972 and was elected an Associate Member of the International Cricket Council on 24 July 1973. It is also a Member of the East Asia-Pacific Cricket Council.

In July 2020, Cricket PNG won the Gray-Nicolls Participation Programme of the Year award, in the ICC's Annual Development Awards to recognise developing cricketing nations.

Home ground
 Amini Park is a cricket ground in Port Moresby, Papua New Guinea.  
The ground is named for the Amini family, several of whom have played cricket for Papua New Guinea (both the men's and women's teams), the ground has seen the men's team play Australia, the West Indies and Victoria. 

The women's team played Japan in a three match series at the ground in September 2006.

References

External links
 Cricinfo-Papua New Guinea
 cricketpng
 ICC

Cricket administration
Papua New Guinea in international cricket
Cricket in Papua New Guinea